Constant or The Constant may refer to:

Mathematics
 Constant (mathematics), a non-varying value

Other concepts
 Control variable or scientific constant, in experimentation the unchanging or constant variable
 Physical constant, a physical quantity generally believed to be universal and unchanging
 Constant (computer programming), a value that, unlike a variable, cannot be reassociated with a different value
 Logical constant, a symbol in symbolic logic that has the same meaning in all models, such as the symbol "=" for "equals"

People
 Constant (given name)
 Constant (surname)
 John, Elector of Saxony (1468–1532), known as John the Constant
 Constant Nieuwenhuys (1920-2005), better known as Constant

Places
 Constant, Barbados, a populated place

Arts and entertainment
 "The Constant", a 2008 episode of the television show Lost
 The Constant (Story of the Year album)
 The Constant (I Blame Coco album)
 Constants (band), an American rock band